The Hoteo River is a river of the Auckland Region of New Zealand. It flows southwest from its sources close to the North Auckland Peninsula's east coast before emptying into the southern lobe of the Kaipara Harbour.

Description

The headwaters of the Hoteo River is the Waitapu Stream that starts within 5 km of the East Coast and the system drains out into the West Coast of Northland. The Hoteo forms at the confluence of the Whangaripo and Waiwhiu streams.

State Highway 1 crosses the river at Wayby, south of Wellsford and State Highway 16 crosses the river near Mangakura where it discharges into the Kaipara Harbour. The North Auckland Rail Line crosses the Hoteo river 3 times within 1.5 km; to the north of Kaipara Flats.

The lower reaches of the river are popular with whitebaiters and recreational fishermen and the river also hosts the annual Hoteo River Raft Race, a no-holds-barred event.

Geology 

The river is an antecedent drainage stream. The river began flowing when the surrounding lands were a low-lying plain. Over time, the surrounding land was uplifted, but the Hoteo River retained the same course, creating a gorge through the uplifting rock.

History

The Hoteo River was a traditional rohe (border) marker for the iwi (tribe) Ngāti Manuhiri's northernmost lands.

See also
List of rivers of New Zealand

References

External links 
 Building railway bridge and Tauhoa Tunnel in 1906
 Flood in 1907
 River crossing in 1907
 Hoteo River in 1911

Rodney Local Board Area
Rivers of the Auckland Region
Rivers of New Zealand
Kaipara Harbour catchment